A-Leagues is an umbrella term to describe several Australian association football competitions which are overseen by the Australian Professional Leagues (beginning in 2021) and Football Australia (previously):

 A-League Men, the highest-tier professional football competition for men, previously known as the A-League
 A-League Women, the highest-tier professional football competition for women, previously known as the W-League
 A-League Youth, a development-oriented football competition for A-League Men's and Women's clubs, previously known as the Y-League